Bernard Oulion (born 7 October 1946 in Saint-Étienne), known professionally as Bernard Lavilliers, is a French singer-songwriter and actor.

Discography

Albums
Studio albums
 Premiers pas... (1968)
 Les poètes (1972)
 Le Stéphanois (1974)
 Les Barbares (1976)
 15e Round (1977)
 Pouvoirs (1979)
 O gringo (1980)
 Nuit d'Amour (1981)
 Etat d'Urgence (1983)
 Tout est permis, rien n'est possible (1984)
 Voleur de feu (1986)
 If... (1988)
 Solo (1991)
 Champs du possible (1994–95)
 Duos Taratata (1996)

Live albums
 T'es vivant...? (1978)
 Live Tour 80 (1980)
 Olympia "Live 84" (1984)
 Live – On The Road Again 1989 (1990)

Compilations
 Gentilshommes de fortune – Rêves et voyages (1987)

Singles
(Selective)

See also
List of French singers

References

External links

 Biography of Bernard Lavilliers, from Radio France Internationale

1946 births
Living people
Actors from Saint-Étienne
French male singers
Musicians from Saint-Étienne